Kharai may refer to:
 Kharai-ye Bala, and Kharai-ye Pain - two neighbouring villages in Ahmadi Rural District, Iran
 Kharai, a village in the Kachchh district, Gujarat, India.
 Kharai, a breed of camels found in India

See also 
 Matta Kharai, in Pakistan.